John E. Carter (June 2, 1934 – August 21, 2009) was an American doo-wop and R&B singer. He was a founding member of The Flamingos and a member of The Dells. Both groups have been inducted into the Rock and Roll Hall of Fame, making Carter one of the few multiple inductees.

He joined The Dells as a replacement for Johnny Funches in 1960 and remained an active member of the group until his death. He was a veteran of the United States Army where he served as a cook. Carter died of lung cancer in Harvey, Illinois at the age of 75.

References

External links
 
 

1934 births
2009 deaths
Deaths from lung cancer
20th-century African-American male singers
American rhythm and blues musicians
The Flamingos members
United States Army soldiers
 deaths from cancer in Illinois
Burials at Abraham Lincoln National Cemetery